Dennis Alfred Silverthorne (1 February 1923 in Brighton, England – 2 January 2004 in London, Ontario, Canada) was a British pair skater who competed with his sister Winifred Silverthorne.  The pair won the silver medal at the 1947 European Figure Skating Championships and finished fourth at that year's World Figure Skating Championships.  They then finished fifth at the 1948 Winter Olympics and sixth at that year's World Championships.

After his competitive career, Silverthorne moved to Canada and became a coach.  Most notable among his students was 1963 World Champion Donald McPherson.  Silverthorne was inducted into the Skate Canada Hall of Fame in 2006.

Results
(with Silverthorne)

External links
 
 Skate Canada Hall of Fame

British male pair skaters
Olympic figure skaters of Great Britain
Figure skaters at the 1948 Winter Olympics
1923 births
2004 deaths
European Figure Skating Championships medalists
British emigrants to Canada